Isack Alexandre Hadjar (born 28 September 2004) is a French-Algerian racing driver who is currently racing in the 2023 Formula 2 Championship for Hitech Pulse–Eight. He most competed in the FIA Formula 3 Championship for Hitech, ending the season in fourth place. He was the 2021 Formula Regional European rookie champion and is a member of the Red Bull Junior Team.

Career

Karting 
Hadjar was born in Paris and started karting in 2015. In the first two years he competed in national championships, and in his final year of karting Hadjar raced in the CIK-FIA European OK Junior Championship, beating future Red Bull academy teammate Jak Crawford.

Lower formulae 
In 2019 Hadjar made his single seater debut in the French F4 Championship. He achieved one race victory at Spa and finished seventh in the standings. The Frenchman then raced in two weekends of the F4 UAE Championship during the winter of 2020 with 3Y Technology, where he scored 56 points, leading to eleventh in the championship. Hadjar then once again drove in the French F4 series. He fared much better than in the previous year, winning three races. After eight further podiums and two pole positions Hadjar finished third in the drivers' standings.

Formula Regional Championships

2021 

The Frenchman made his debut at the Formula Regional level in 2021, competing in the first three rounds of the F3 Asian Championship with Evans GP. He impressed right from the start, scoring a myriad of podium finishes, which included three podiums in the second round at Yas Marina. Despite not taking part in the latter rounds of the campaign, Hadjar managed to finish sixth in the standings, highes of all part-time entrants.

Hadjar's main campaign would lie in the Formula Regional European Championship, where he partnered Zane Maloney, Léna Bühler and fellow countryman Hadrien David at R-ace GP. The Frenchman scored his first points, along with his first rookie win, at the first round in Imola. He then proceeded to score his first podium at the next event, held in Barcelona, and achieved his first Formula Regional victory in the first race on the streets of Monaco. At that same weekend Hadjar finished second in race two, only behind teammate Maloney, and closed in on the championship lead held by Grégoire Saucy. However, Hadjar would be unable to score a podium finish until the final round of the season, despite amassing a number of finishes in the top six. Following a disappointing round at Mugello where he hadn't scored any points the Frenchman bounced back with a double podium in that final round at Monza, scoring a win in the second race after the leading pair collided. Hadjar ended up fifth in the standings, just four points behind teammate Maloney, and won the honours for the best rookie of the season.

2022 
At the start of 2022, Hadjar raced in the Formula Regional Asian Championship with Hitech Grand Prix.

FIA Formula 3 Championship 

In November of 2021 Hadjar drove for Hitech Grand Prix in the FIA Formula 3 post-season test. He would eventually be announced to drive for the team in the 2022 season in January. He started his season out in the best way possible, inheriting victory in the Sakhir sprint race after original winner Ollie Bearman had received a five-second time penalty for track limits infringements. The feature race would be less successful, as Hadjar finished 25th after suffering a puncture caused by contact with Roman Staněk.

FIA Formula 2 Championship 
Hadjar was invited to test for Hitech Grand Prix at the 2022 F2 post-season test in Yas Marina. On January 2023, Hadjar was announced to be progressing into the 2023 Formula 2 Championship, continuing his relationship with Hitech alongside Jak Crawford.

Formula One 
On 16 June 2021, Red Bull announced that Hadjar was to become a member of the Red Bull Junior Team in 2022.

Karting record

Karting career summary

Complete CIK-FIA Karting European Championship results 
(key) (Races in bold indicate pole position) (Races in italics indicate fastest lap)

Racing record

Racing career summary

Complete French F4 Championship results 
(key) (Races in bold indicate pole position) (Races in italics indicate fastest lap)

Complete Formula Regional Asian Championship results 
(key) (Races in bold indicate pole position) (Races in italics indicate the fastest lap of top ten finishers)

* Season still in progress.

Complete Formula Regional European Championship results 
(key) (Races in bold indicate pole position) (Races in italics indicate fastest lap)

Complete FIA Formula 3 Championship results 
(key) (Races in bold indicate pole position; races in italics indicate fastest lap)

Complete FIA Formula 2 Championship results 
(key) (Races in bold indicate pole position) (Races in italics indicate points for the fastest lap of top ten finishers)

References

External links 
 
 

2004 births
Living people
French sportspeople of Algerian descent
French racing drivers
French F4 Championship drivers
F3 Asian Championship drivers
Formula Regional Asian Championship drivers
Formula Regional European Championship drivers
FIA Formula 3 Championship drivers
R-ace GP drivers
Hitech Grand Prix drivers
Karting World Championship drivers
UAE F4 Championship drivers
FIA Formula 2 Championship drivers